Lord Beckett may refer to:
 Lord Cutler Beckett, a minor fictional character in the second and third Pirates of the Caribbean films
 John Beckett, Lord Beckett, a Senator of the College of Justice in Scotland from 2016